Michael Edward Doughty (born 20 November 1992) is a former professional footballer who played as a midfielder.

Early life
Doughty was born Westminster, Greater London, the son of the late Nottingham Forest owner Nigel Doughty. He was educated at Harrow School, obtaining 14 A grades.

Club career

QPR
Doughty joined the youth set-up at QPR as a schoolboy at the age of 14, after five years in the academy at Chelsea. He made his debut for QPR in the FA Cup defeat against Blackburn Rovers, after coming off the bench in the 88th minute.
Doughty's Premier League debut for QPR came on 10 February 2015 at the age of 22, under caretaker managers Chris Ramsey and Kevin Bond, coming on as an 85th-minute substitute against Sunderland at Stadium of Light in what was QPR's first away victory (in fact their first away points) of the season.

Crawley Town (Loan)
In August 2011 he signed a six-month loan deal with Crawley Town.

Aldershot Town (Loan)
On 5 March 2012, Doughty joined League Two side Aldershot Town on a one-month loan deal.

St Johnstone (Loan)
On 29 January 2013 Doughty joined Scottish Premier League side St Johnstone on loan.

Stevenage F.C (Loan)
Two weeks into the 2013–14 season, Doughty joined League One side Stevenage on loan until January 2014. He made his debut a day after signing, on 17 August, playing the whole game in a 1–0 home defeat to Leyton Orient. On 26 October 2013, Doughty scored a 90th-minute goal, his first goal in professional football, a left-footed angled shot from the left flank into the far corner, during Stevenage's home match against Crawley Town.

Gillingham (Loan)
On 24 October 2014 Doughty joined League One side Gillingham on an initial one-month loan deal, which was later extended for a further two months. He was recalled by QPR on 9 January 2015.

Swindon Town (Loan)
In January 2016 Doughty joined League One side Swindon Town until the end of the 2015–16 season. Doughty rejoined the club following season on a season long loan.

Peterborough United 
On 29 June 2017 Doughty signed for Peterborough United of League One on three-year contract.

Return to Swindon Town
On 23 July 2018, following a spell at Peterborough United, Doughty returned to Swindon Town on a two-year deal.

On 4 August 2018, Doughty started against Macclesfield Town on the opening day of the League Two season. Swindon won two penalties in the 96th and the 98th minute meaning Swindon won the game 3–2, with Doughty scoring a hat-trick as he scored both the penalties. Doughty finished August with five goals to his name and was nominated for the League Two player of the month award.

In July 2019 he signed a new contract with Swindon until 2022.

On 12 September 2020 Doughty left Swindon Town due to personal reasons.

Retirement 
Doughty retired from football at the end of the 2019–20 season.

International career
He has been capped at under-19 level internationally for Wales, playing in a friendly against Liechtenstein.

In August 2012 Doughty was selected in the Wales Under-21 squad for the 2013 UEFA European Under-21 Football Championship qualification match against Czech Republic on 10 September 2012.

Career statistics

Honours
Swindon Town
EFL League Two: 2019–20

References

External links

Player profile at qpr.co.uk

1992 births
Living people
Footballers from Westminster
English footballers
Welsh footballers
Wales youth international footballers
Wales under-21 international footballers
Association football midfielders
Queens Park Rangers F.C. players
Woking F.C. players
Crawley Town F.C. players
Aldershot Town F.C. players
St Johnstone F.C. players
Stevenage F.C. players
Gillingham F.C. players
Swindon Town F.C. players
English Football League players
Scottish Premier League players
Premier League players
English people of Welsh descent
People educated at Harrow School